is a city located in Ibaraki Prefecture, Japan. , the city had an estimated population of 68,777 in 28,103 households and a population density of 1926 persons per km². The percentage of the population aged over 65 was 23.1%.

Geography
Moriya is located in southwestern Ibaraki Prefecture, bordering on Chiba Prefecture to the southwest. The city is surrounded by three rivers, the Kinugawa, Kokaigawa and the Tone River, one of the longest rivers in Japan.  In terms of area, it is the smallest city in Ibaraki Prefecture. It is located approximately 35 kilometers from central Tokyo.

Surrounding municipalities
Ibaraki Prefecture
 Tsukubamirai
 Toride
 Jōsō
Chiba Prefecture
 Noda
Kashiwa

Climate
Moriya has a Humid continental climate (Köppen Cfa) characterized by warm summers and cool winters with light snowfall.  The average annual temperature in Moriya is 14.4 °C. The average annual rainfall is 1325 mm with September as the wettest month. The temperatures are highest on average in August, at around 26.3 °C, and lowest in January, at around 3.5 °C.

Demographics
Per Japanese census data, the population of Moriya has grown rapidly since the 1970s.

History
Moriya developed in the Kamakura period as a castle town ruled by the Sōma clan, who ruled northern Shimōsa Province. During the Edo period Tokugawa shogunate, much of the area was ruled as part of Sakura Domain, followed by Sekiyado Domain.  The town of Moriya was established within Kitasōma District on April 1, 1889 with the creation of the modern municipalities system. It was elevated to city status February 2, 2002.

Government
Moriya has a mayor-council form of government with a directly elected mayor and a unicameral city council of 20 members. Moriya contributes one member to the Ibaraki Prefectural Assembly. In terms of national politics, the city is part of Ibaraki 3rd district of the lower house of the Diet of Japan.

Economy
Moriya was an agricultural area until the late 1970s, when the development of new towns and industrial parks made it a commuter town and suburb of greater Tokyo.

Education
Moriya has nine public elementary schools and four public middle schools operated by the city government, and one public high school operated by the Ibaraki Prefectural Board of Education. There are also one private elementary school and three private high schools.

Transportation

Railway
Metropolitan Intercity Railway Company - Tsukuba Express

Kantō Railway - Jōsō Line
  -  -

Highway
  – Moriya Service Area, Yawara Interchange

Sister city relations
 - Greeley, Colorado, USA, sister city since August 1993 
 - Mainburg, Germany, friendship city since September 1990

Local attractions
site of Moriya Castle

Notable people from Moriya 
Masakatsu Sawa, professional football player
Takuya Terada, actor, singer, model

References

External links

Official Website 

Cities in Ibaraki Prefecture
Moriya, Ibaraki